Ahmadabad District may refer to:
 Ahmadabad District (Afghanistan)
 Ahmadabad District (Iran)
 Ahmedabad District (India)